Viktor Illarionovich Ivchenko (Ukrainian: Віктор Іларіонович Івченко) was a Soviet film director and writer. He was the father of another film director, Boris Ivchenko.

Ivchenko was born in the city of Bohodukhiv, Kharkov Governorate, on October 9, 1912. In 1933 he graduated from the Kharkiv Road-Construction College and in 1937 - the Kyiv Theater Institute. Ivchenko also was a play director of the Ukrainian Drama Theater of M.Zankovetska (1937–1953) and a film director of the Dovzhenko Film Studios (1953–1972).

Ivchenko was first married to Olga Nozhkina, later - Ninel Myshkova.

He wrote scripts for "Forest Song" (1961) and "Annychka" (1968).

Filmography
 "Marina's Destiny" (1953)
 "Nazar Stodolya" (1955)
 "There is a such fellow" (1956)
 E.A. — Extraordinary Accident (1958)
 "Ivanna" (1959)
 "Forest Song" (1961)
 "Hello, Hnat!" (1962)
 "Silver coach" (1963)
 "The Viper" (1965)
 "The 10th step" (1967)
 "Frost was falling" (1969)
 "Way to Heart" (1970)
 "Sofia Hrushko" (1971)

He died on September 7, 1972, at the age of 60.

Awards and Prizes
 Order of the Red Banner of Labour
 Second prize at the 2nd All-Union film festival in Kiev and the 3rd All-Union film festival in Minsk
 Shevchenko National Prize
 People's Artist of the Ukrainian SSR (1960)

Awards
In 1953, Ivchenko and Isaak Shmaruk were nominated for the Grand Prize of the Festival at the 1953 Cannes Film Festival for the film "Marina's Destiny".

External links
 
 

1912 births
1972 deaths
People from Bohodukhiv
Communist Party of the Soviet Union members
Kyiv National I. K. Karpenko-Kary Theatre, Cinema and Television University alumni
Academic staff of Kyiv National I. K. Karpenko-Kary Theatre, Cinema and Television University
Recipients of the title of People's Artists of Ukraine
Recipients of the Order of Lenin
Recipients of the Order of the Red Banner of Labour
Recipients of the Shevchenko National Prize
Soviet drama teachers
Soviet film directors
Ukrainian film directors

Burials at Baikove Cemetery